Roman Denissen (July 13, 1918 – January 21, 2008) was mayor of Green Bay, Wisconsin.

Biography
Denissen was born on July 13, 1918 in Bellevue, Wisconsin. His father, Matt, was Supervisor of Bellevue. Denissen married Ursula Carmody in 1939. They had one son before her death in 1983. In 1984, he married Agnes (Johnson) Le Clair. She died in 2003. Denissen died on January 21, 2008. He was Roman Catholic and a member of the Knights of Columbus.

Political career
Denissen was elected to the City Council of Green Bay in 1952. He was named President of the Council in 1955. He ran unsuccessfully for Mayor against Otto Rachals in 1957. Two years later, he ran against Rachals again, this time winning. He served as Mayor until 1965, when he was defeated for re-election by Donald Tilleman.

References

See also
The Political Graveyard

Wisconsin city council members
Mayors of Green Bay, Wisconsin
Catholics from Wisconsin
1918 births
2008 deaths
20th-century American politicians